is a Japanese adult visual novel developed by Leaf, and was originally released on May 1, 1998 for Microsoft Windows as a CD-ROM. A PlayStation 3 version published by Aquaplus with several modification was released in 2010. A sequel to the original visual novel, titled White Album 2, was released in two parts in 2010 and 2011. The gameplay in White Album follows a linear plot line, which offers pre-determined scenarios and courses of interaction, and focuses on the appeal of the female main characters.

White Album has received several transitions to other media. A manga adaptation illustrated by Japanese illustrator Chako Abeno began serialization in the shōnen magazine Dengeki Daioh in August 2008. It was followed by an anime adaptation produced by Seven Arcs, which began broadcast in Japan on January 3, 2009. Characters from White Album are also featured as partner characters Aquapazza: Aquaplus Dream Match, a fighting game developed by Aquaplus with characters from various Leaf games.

Gameplay

The gameplay in White Album requires little player interaction as most of the game's duration is spent on reading the text that appears on the screen, which represents either dialogue between the various characters or the inner thoughts of the protagonist. Before the beginning of every week in the game's storyline, the player is given the option to plan a schedule, and is allowed to participate in various activities or to take the day off for rest. Different events associated with different characters occur depending on the activities the player chooses to participate. During several of these events, the player will also be given the chance to engage the character in a conversation, where he or she may also pick a topic as the basis of the conversation. Every so often, the player will come to a "decision point", where he or she is given the chance to choose from options that are displayed on the screen, typically two to three at a time. The time between these points varies and can occur anywhere from a minute to much longer. Text progression pauses at these points and depending on which choice the player makes, the plot will progress in a specific direction. To view all of the plot lines, the player will need to replay the game multiple times and make different schedules and choices during decision points to progress the plot in an alternate direction.

Plot and characters
He has a timid, yet vulgar personality, and is often unorganized. Yuki, White Album main heroine, is an idol singer who is rising in popularity, and is affiliated with the Ogata Productions. She has a warm and kindhearted personality, and is in her second year at university. She and Tōya were students at the same high school. , another heroine, is a popular idol singer with the same management agency as Yuki. Rina is elegant and intelligent, and good friends with Yuki. She is lonely because of her busy work schedule and develops feelings for Tōya.

Tōya also meets several other characters throughout the story. , is a gentle and caring third year university student. She likes to read and cook, and like Yuki, she attended high school with Tōya prior to entering university.  has known Tōya since kindergarten and is in her second year of university. Haruka is very quiet and although she is athletic, generally prefers leisure sports such as taking walks. She used to play tennis but stopped after her brother's untimely death. , White Album fifth heroine, is a high school student whom Tōya tutors. Mana has an impudent and aggressive personality. She is antisocial and dislikes interacting with others, to the extent that at times she skips both school and Tōya's tutoring sessions.

Development
White Album is the sixth game developed by Leaf, after their previous titles such as To Heart. Scenario for White Album was worked on by Udaru Harada, as his second work on a visual novel; scenario assistance was provided by Akihide Takebayashi. Art direction and character designs for the game was provided by Hisashi Kawata. Work on the music for the game was split between three people, Shinya Ishikawa, Kazuhide Nakagami, and Naoya Shimokawa, the president of Aquaplus. Much of the development team, with the exception of Harada, have previously worked on Leaf's previous title, To Heart.

Release history
White Album was first released to the public on May 1, 1998 as a CD-ROM, playable on Windows 95. The game was later re-released on June 20, 2003, with additional support for later versions of the Microsoft Windows operating system. An all-ages version for the PlayStation 3 entitled  was released on June 24, 2010 by Aquaplus, with full-voice acting and additional scenarios, while eliminating simulation elements found in the original release. An all-ages port for Windows XP, Vista, and 7 operating systems, based on the PS3 version, was released for download on the content delivery website DMM.com on March 30, 2012, and a downloadable version of the PS3 game followed on November 27, 2014.

Shimokawa stated that the development team decided to produce a PlayStation 3 version as they wanted to recreate the game in high-definition quality, and because they wanted to provide accessibility for players who have played Tears to Tiara: Kakan no Daichi. The PS3 version employs the Motion Portrait technology in its graphics rendering to create animated sprites. Shimokawa explained that although several other visual novel titles employed 3D computer graphics to create animations, the technology was unable to portray the details that artists maintain in their original illustrations, and the decision to use Motion Portrait was made in order to allow fluid animations to be created using static 2D computer graphics. The technology took the development team a year to perfect, because of complications such as unnatural character movement; Kawata commented that the process took more time than the illustrations to complete. He noted that it was complicated to adapt his character designs for the PS3 version, as he attempted to create an overall design that resembles the graphics found in the original Windows version, but without its dated appearance.

Sequel
A sequel to the original visual novel entitled White Album 2: Introductory Chapter developed by Leaf was released on March 26, 2010. The second part, White Album 2: Closing Chapter was released on December 22, 2011.

Adaptations

Manga
White Album was first adapted into a manga series illustrated by Japanese illustrator Chako Abeno, known for her previous work on Sola. The manga adaptation began its serialization in the shōnen manga magazine Dengeki Daioh on June 27, 2008, and was published by ASCII Media Works in three compiled volumes.

Anime

White Album has also received an anime adaptation based on the visual novel. The anime series, produced by Seven Arcs, directed by Akira Yoshimura and written by Hiroaki Satō, is broadcast in two sets of thirteen episodes. The first thirteen episodes began broadcasting in Japan on January 3, 2009 on the TV Kanagawa broadcasting network, and was followed by other networks later the same month. A second set of thirteen episodes was broadcast in Fall 2009. In a magazine published interview, producer Akio Mishima and Aquaplus' president Naoya Shimokawa stated that an anime adaptation was considered by King Records as early as the time the visual novel was released, but was not discussed until three years prior to the interview.

Music
Three pieces of theme music were used in the visual novel. The opening theme, "White Album", also used as an insert song, was performed and written by a ghostwriter and is credited to Yuki Morikawa, one of the heroines of the game, and was composed by Shinya Ishikawa. The insert song, "Sound of Destiny", was credited to Rina Ogata, another heroine, for performance, and was written by Shōko Sudani and composed by Kazuhide Nakagami. The ending theme, "Powder Snow", was sung by Akko, and was written by Sudani and composed by Naoya Shimokawa. Each song, with the exception of the ending theme which was arranged solely by Shimokawa, was arranged by Junya Matsuoka and the songs' respective composers. A maxi single titled "White Album" was later released on December 23, 1998, containing the three theme songs.

The opening theme to the first season of the anime adaptation is "Shin'ai" performed by Nana Mizuki and the ending theme is "Maiochiru Yuki no Yō ni" performed by Suara. The opening theme to the second season of the anime adaption is "Mugen" also performed by Nana Mizuki and the ending theme is "Akai Ito" performed by Suara, both are released on October 28, 2009. Five insert singles were also released under the names of the main heroines.  "White Album" and "Koi iro sora" were performed by Aya Hirano as Yuki Morikawa; "Sound of Destiny" and "Powder Snow" by Nana Mizuki as Rina Ogata. A final single, "Powder Snow (Live Ver.)" was released by both singers as a duet. The soundtrack and character songs were compiled into the album, White Album Character Song Best & Soundtrack.

References

External links
 Official Leaf White Album visual novel website 
 Official Aquaplus White Album visual novel website 
 Anime's official website  
 
 

1998 video games
2008 manga
Anime television series based on video games
ASCII Media Works manga
Bishōjo games
Chako Abeno
Dengeki Daioh
Drama anime and manga
Eroge
Harem anime and manga
Harem video games
Japan-exclusive video games
Manga based on video games
PlayStation 3 games
Romance video games
Seven Arcs
Shōnen manga
Video games developed in Japan
Visual novels
Windows games
Leaf (Japanese company) games
Aquaplus games